'Tirur village' (or Tiruvur) is a panchayat located in the Thiruvallur district of Tamil-Nadu state, India. The latitude 13.1017962 and longitude 79.9668308 are the geocoordinates of the Tirur. Chennai is the state capital for Tirur village. It is located around 35.3 kilometers from Tirur. The village well connected by rail route from the Chennai central suburbs nearest railway stations are Sevvapettai 1.5 km.

The surrounding nearby villages and its distance from Tirur are Aranvoyal 1.3 km, Perumalpattu 2.9 km, Putlur 3.9 km, Thaneerkulam 4.8 km, Ayalur 7.0 km, Tiruvallur 7.4 km, Veeraragavapuram 7.6 km, Sivanvoyal 7.9 km, Ikkadu 8.1 km, Koyambakkam 8.1 km, Perathur 8.3 km, Ikkadukandigai 8.4 km, Kalyanakuppam 9.9 km, Melanur 10.9 km, Vishnuvakkam 11.4 km, Velliyur 13.3 km, Karikalavakkam 13.6 km, Arumbakkam 26.2 km, Vilapakkam, Thozhur, Selai .
1) The village has the very famous Shiva Temple which is more than 1,000 years old. The temple was converted as rock temple by Jatavarman Sundara Pandyan I around 1260CE. The temple name is Arulmigu Singandeswarar Udanurai Uthbalambal Thirukovil. The temple is very near to the Teachers Training Institution and can be reached by public transportation from the railway station. Also, there is an old Kariamanicka Perumal temple just opposite this Sivan temple which is in dilapidated condition. This temple made up of special red stones.

2)Tamil Nadu most famous Paddy experimental station started in tirur (or Tiruvur) in 1942. Brought under the control of Tamil Nadu Agricultural University in 1981. Renamed as Rice Research Station in 1982.

It is located south of Chennai -Arakkonam Railway line and about 1.5 km from Sevvapet Road Railway station and 35 km from Chennai.
Latitude :  13˚7�N
Longitude:  79˚58�E
Altitude :  39.47m MSL
Average rainfall :  1184mm
Maximum temperature (Mean) :  33.1˚C          
Minimum temperature (Mean):  22.5�C
Soil :  Sandy clay, Non-calcareous light brown Medium fertile
Total area of the research centre :  15.85 hectares
Cropping area  :  12.00 hectares
Crops under  cultivation  :  Rice, Pulses, Oil seeds and Green manures.

Villages in Tiruvallur district